The Metronome is a  functioning metronome in Letná Park, overlooking the Vltava River and the city center of Prague. It was erected in 1991, on the plinth left vacant by the demolition in the spring of 1963 of an enormous monument to former Soviet leader Joseph Stalin.  The metronome was designed by international artist Vratislav Novak. It may be the largest metronome in the world.

Although the metronome is functional, it is not always in operation. A plaque at the base of the Prague metronome reads "In time, all things pass...'. The metronome beats at 4 beats per minute.

The site offers a scenic view of the city and is now mostly used as a meeting place for skateboarders, electric scooter drivers and other people.

References

External links

Article showing former Stalin monument

1991 establishments in Czechoslovakia
Buildings and structures completed in 1991
Buildings and structures in Prague
Individual clocks
Pendulums
Tourist attractions in Prague
Prague 7
20th-century architecture in the Czech Republic